Peyo Yavorov (born Peyo Totev Kracholov, Пейо Тотев Крачолов; 13 January 1878 – 29 October 1914) was a Bulgarian Symbolist poet.  He was considered to be one of the finest poetic talents in the fin de siècle Kingdom of Bulgaria. Yavorov was a prominent member of the "Misal" ("Мисъл") literary and cultural group. His life and work are closely connected with the liberation movement Internal Macedonian-Adrianople Revolutionary Organization in Macedonia. He was also a supporter of the Armenian Independence Movement, and wrote a number of poems about Armenians.

Most of his poems are romantic in subject, and dedicated to the two women in his life – Mina Todorova and Lora Karavelova. His first (and arguably greatest) love Mina died from tuberculosis, which greatly saddened Yavorov. She was buried in the cemetery of Boulogne Billancourt.

Later on he met Lora, the daughter of statesman Petko Karavelov. They were married, and the letters correspondence between them was considered evidence of their ardent and vivid love, and thus different from the relationship Yavorov had with Mina Todorova. In 1913, Lora shot herself and Yavorov tried to commit suicide. The bullet went through his temporal bone, which left him blind. In despair over the trial provoked by Lora's death and the rumor that he had killed her, Yavorov poisoned and then shot himself in autumn 1914, at the age of 36.

Honours 

Yavorov Peak on Livingston Island in the South Shetland Islands, Antarctica is named after Peyo Yavorov.
In addition, a number of elementary (primary), middle and high (secondary) schools across Bulgaria also bear his name (e.g. the Peyo Kr. Yavorov Middle/High School in Plovdiv).

An elementary school in Yerevan, Armenia is named after Peyo Yavorov.

See also
24 SOU "P.K. Yavorov"

Notes

References 
 Rozalia Hristova, "Road Scholars", in The Sofia Echo, 5 April 2001. Retrieved 6 July 2007
 "Bulgarian poems in the public transport of Washington, D.C.", Radio Bulgaria, 31 May 2007. Retrieved 6 July 2007
 Art Center Haskovo – "Peyo Yavorov", Cultural Community Center in Haskovo, Bulgaria.
 Tufarulo, G, M. Das Graue Elend – La fredda impenetrabile notte di Pejo Javorov, Roma: Passaporto, 2001.

External links

1878 births
1914 suicides
People from Chirpan
Bulgarian poets
Bulgarian male poets
Bulgarian revolutionaries
Bulgarian military personnel of the Balkan Wars
Recipients of the Order of Bravery
Suicides by firearm
Symbolist poets
Blind poets
Members of the Internal Macedonian Revolutionary Organization
Thracian Bulgarians
Bulgarian nationalists
Bulgarian blind people